Tambili is a village in the Gaongo Department of Bazèga Province in central Burkina Faso. The village has a population of 436.

References

Populated places in the Centre-Sud Region
Bazèga Province